Cioara may refer to the following places:

Romania
 Cioara and Cioara-Doicești, former names for Bărăganul, Brăila County
 Cioara, the former name for Săliștea, a commune in Alba County
 Cioara de Sus, a village in the commune Baia de Arieș, Alba County
 Cioara (Arieș), a tributary of the Arieș in Alba County
 Cioara (Mureș), a tributary of the Mureș in Alba County
 Cioara, a tributary of the Sălaj in Satu Mare and Sălaj Counties
 Valea Ciorii, a tributary of the Baldovin in Hunedoara County

Moldova
 Cioara, Hîncești, a village in Hîncești district